Ataşehir is the western terminus of the Karşıyaka Tram in İzmir, Turkey. It is located in the residential neighborhood of Ataşehir, Çiğli on 8291st Street. However, ESHOT operates regular bus service between the two stations to compensate the gap.

References

Railway stations opened in 2017
2017 establishments in Turkey
Çiğli District
Tram transport in İzmir